Elamipretide (also known as SS-31, MTP-131 and Bendavia) is a small mitochondrially-targeted tetrapeptide (D-Arg-dimethylTyr-Lys-Phe-NH2) that appears to reduce the production of toxic reactive oxygen species and stabilize cardiolipin.

Stealth Peptides, a privately held company, was founded in 2006 to develop intellectual property licensed from several universities including elamipretide; it subsequently changed its name to Stealth BioTherapeutics.

As of November 2017 Stealth had obtained an orphan designation in the US for use in mitochondrial myopathy and had started a Phase III trial in that indication. As of January 2020, trial expectations were not met.

References 

Tetrapeptides
Experimental drugs